Nemanja Jovšić (born 7 October 1983) is a Serbian former professional footballer who played as a goalkeeper.

Club career
In June 2001, Jovšić signed his first professional contract with Partizan. He spent the next few years on loan at their affiliated club Teleoptik. In the 2004–05 season, Jovšić was promoted to the first team and made one league appearance in the process, as the club won the championship title. He then went on a six-month loan to Jedinstvo Bijelo Polje, before returning to Partizan in January 2006. Until the end of the 2005–06 season, Jovšić appeared in two league games for the Black-Whites. He was subsequently sent on loan to Smederevo, before returning to Partizan and making two league appearances in the second part of the 2006–07 season.

International career
Jovšić represented FR Yugoslavia at the 2001 UEFA European Under-18 Championship, serving as a backup for Vukašin Poleksić.

Honours

Club
Partizan
 First League of Serbia and Montenegro: 2004–05
Zemun
 Serbian Cup: Runner-up 2007–08

Individual
 Serbian Cup Best Player: 2007–08

Notes

References

External links
 
 

Association football goalkeepers
Association football goalkeeping coaches
First League of Serbia and Montenegro players
FK Banat Zrenjanin players
FK Hajduk Kula players
FK Inđija players
FK Jedinstvo Bijelo Polje players
FK Partizan non-playing staff
FK Partizan players
FK Smederevo players
FK Teleoptik players
FK Zemun players
Serbia and Montenegro under-21 international footballers
Serbian footballers
Serbian SuperLiga players
Footballers from Belgrade
1983 births
Living people